The Lonaconing Historic District is a national historic district in Lonaconing, Allegany County, Maryland.  It comprises 278 buildings and structures consisting of a variety of 19th and early-20th century commercial, industrial, and residential buildings.  These structures identify with the development of Lonaconing as a center of the iron, coal, and silk industries in the George's Creek Valley of Western Maryland.  It includes a group of 40 late-19th and early-20th century brick or frame commercial structures, including a hotel, bank, three dry goods stores, and numerous other shops and warehouses, mostly constructed after a fire which devastated downtown in 1881.

It was listed on the National Register of Historic Places in 1983.

References

External links
, including photo in 2002, at Maryland Historical Trust
Boundary Map of the Lonaconing Historic District, Allegany County, at Maryland Historical Trust

Historic districts on the National Register of Historic Places in Maryland
Historic districts in Allegany County, Maryland
National Register of Historic Places in Allegany County, Maryland